Baltimore City College, known colloquially as City, City College, and B.C.C., is a college preparatory school with a liberal arts focus and selective admissions criteria located in Baltimore, Maryland. Opened in October 1839, B.C.C. is the third-oldest active public high school in the United States. City College is a public exam school and an International Baccalaureate World School at which students in the ninth and tenth grades participate in the IB Middle Years Programme while students in the eleventh and twelfth grades participate in the IB Diploma Programme. The school is situated on a  hill-top campus located in the Coldstream-Homestead-Montebello neighborhood in Northeast Baltimore. The main campus building, a designated National Historic Landmark, is constructed of granite and limestone in a Collegiate Gothic architectural style and features a 200-foot-tall Gothic tower.

History

In response to increasing public pressure due to the changing needs of Baltimore's trade and commercial classes, political leaders introduced legislation establishing a high school. The resolution establishing the school was unanimously passed by the Baltimore City Council on March 7, 1839 and was signed into law by Mayor, Shepard C. Leakin. "The High School" opened with 46 pupils under the direction of Professor Nathan C. Brooks,(1809–1898), a locally-noted classical educator and poet, the first head of school of a new type of higher institution in Baltimore's developing public education system. "The High School" opened on October 20, 1839 and was initially housed in a rented building on Courtland Street (present-day Saint Paul Street/Place) "under the direction of Professor Nathan C. Brooks (1809–1898), a locally renowned Classics scholar. The school was housed at three different locations in its first three years of existence before returning to its original building on Courtland Street. The City Council in 1843 allocated $23,000 to acquire the nearby Assembly Rooms building at the northeast corner of East Fayette and Holliday Streets for the new school. The City Council in 1850 granted the Board of School Commissioners the right to confer graduates of the then-decade old high school with certificates of graduation, and the following year in the old Front Street Theatre, along the Jones Falls stream (between East Fayette and Lexington Streets), the school held its first commencement ceremony under the name of the "Central High School of Baltimore" with well-known influential civic citizen and lawyer Severn Teackle Wallis (1816–1894), as its first commencement speaker.

In the wake of an 1865 recommendation from the Baltimore City Public Schools Board of Commissioners, the City College began offering a five-year academic track, in an effort to elevate the school to the status of a baccalaureate degree-conferring college. On October 9, 1866, the City Council renamed the school Baltimore City College. The Council failed to take any further action and B.C.C. was never granted the power to confer Bachelor of Arts degrees. In 1873, a fire spread from the Holliday Street Theater to the Assembly Rooms forcing the City Council to allocate resources to build a new school building. The City Council acquired a lot on North Howard Street opposite West Centre Street and allocated $150,000 for the construction of the new building designed by Baltimore architect Edmund G. Lind and municipal architect George C. Frederick, who also designed the then-new Baltimore City Hall. The new building was constructed in an English Gothic revival style on Howard Street. The new City College building was dedicated on February 1, 1875. The school remained in its new building for just 17 years when it was undermined in 1892 by the construction of the Baltimore & Ohio Railroad tunnel causing the structure to collapse. A new larger structure designed in the Romanesque Revival style by the noted local architects Baldwin & Pennington was erected on the same site. This new building quickly became overcrowded and an annex was established on 26th Street.

The school's enrollment increased significantly during World War I and alumni began organizing a campaign to build a larger building with campus grounds during the early 1920s. In 1926, ground was broken for a massive Collegiate Gothic stone structure designed by the architects Buckler and Fenhagen on "Collegian Hill". This new four-level structure dubbed "The Castle on the Hill" was designed to accommodate 2,500 students and cost almost $3 million, making it one of the most expensive school projects in America. The new school and grounds officially opened April 10, 1928. The main academic building featured arched windows, cornices, cloisters, gargoyles, stained glass, mahogany paneling, plaster arches, chandeliers, terra cotta tiles, and terrazzo floors with two courtyards and was designed to be expanded in the future with the addition of additional wings and buildings. Following the landmark Supreme Court ruling Brown v. Board of Education in May 1954, the school admitted its first Black students in September 1954 without incident. Two years later, the first Black faculty members in school history were assigned to B.C.C. Enrollment at the City College reached a record high of nearly 4,000 students by the mid-1960s, then began to decline in the late-1960s to mid-1970s due, in part, to the opening of newer high schools in the city the suburbs of Baltimore County. In addition to contending with declining enrollment, the school's academic standards also began to decline during the 1970s. The school's once-prestigious A-Course academic track was discontinued in 1973 and a single academic track was offered. In 1978, at the urging of faculty and alumni, City College's landmark main academic building underwent its first-ever major renovations, requiring the school to temporarily relocate for two years. When the campus reopened, B.C.C. admitted female students for the first time in its then-139-year history following a controversial decision by the Baltimore City Public Schools to end City's long-standing tradition of single-sex education.

The school's academic decline continued into the 1980s until Principal Solomon Lausch in the early-1990s introduced a revamped curriculum, raised admissions standards, and secured increased funding and unique local autonomy from the Baltimore City School's Board of Commissioners. B.C.C.'s turn-around accelerated when Joseph Wilson, a former attorney, was hired in 1994 to lead the school following a nationwide search. Wilson strengthened academic standards by introducing the International Baccalaureate (IB) Diploma Program in September 1998.  By the early-2000s, City College was once again routinely counted amount the nation's best high schools. The school was recognized at the start of the 1999-2000 academic year by the U.S. Department of Education as a National Blue Ribbon School.

Campus 

Baltimore City College stands on an expansive, tree-shaded 38-acre (153,781 m2) hill-top campus in northeast Baltimore at the intersection of 33rd Street and the Alameda. The campus consists of two buildings: the Gothic-style edifice known locally as the "Castle on the Hill" which sits in the center of the campus, and the power plant building east of the castle. In addition to providing the building's utilities, the power plant originally housed five workshops: an electrical shop, a mechanical shop, a metal shop, a printing shop, and a wood shop. It currently houses the Coldstream-Homestead-Montebello community corporation headquarters. Both buildings were designed by the architecture firm of Buckler and Fenhagen.

The castle features an iconic 150-foot-tall gothic central tower that is visible from many locations throughout Baltimore. South of the main academic building is George Petrides Stadium at Alumni Field, which serves as home to the school's athletic teams. During a major building renovation in 1978, a modern gymnasium was added to the southwest corner of the main building.

In June 2003, the current building was placed on the National Register of Historic Places. The listing of the building coincided with the structure's 75th anniversary. On April 24, 2007, the building was designated a Baltimore City landmark, which means that the building's exterior cannot be altered without approval of the city's Commission for Historical and Architectural Preservation. On June 21, 2007, the school's Alumni Association received a historic preservation award from Baltimore Heritage for its leadership role in preserving the building as an historic Baltimore landmark. In 2017, Architectural Digest named the school the most beautiful public high school in the state of Maryland.

B.C.C. Center for Teaching and Learning

City College launched in 2015 the Torch Burning Bright campaign, a fundraising effort to modernize and rehab its library and student resource center. The $2.2 million project was designed by local firm JRS Architects and added new spaces for resource stacks; new areas for studying and reading; The Great Hall, a large communal space and reading room; new classrooms, seminar spaces, and conference rooms, a new location for library archives, a listening and viewing room, and office space for school staff.

The B.C.C. Center for Teaching and Learning opened to students and faculty in January 2016 and is staffed by five full-time professionals, including the center director, the head librarian, and three staff coordinating each academic center. In all, the Center for Teaching and Learning includes the following resources for students:
 
 Cordish Technology Center
 Doetsch Hall, the school's premier meeting and presentation space
 Joseph Meyerhoff Library, the school's main library on campus featuring physical and digital collections
 Reed Math and Science Center
 The Writing Center
 The Research Center

Academics

Mission
When it was founded in March 1839 as the flagship school of what later became the Baltimore City Public Schools, Baltimore City College was charged with providing a unique classics- and liberal arts-based course of study and with holding all members of its school community to the highest standards of academic achievement and personal development. The school's mission is to prepare its students to succeed in the best colleges In the United States. The faculty and staff of the school strive to engage every student in a rigorous university preparatory study of liberal arts, provide strong extended academic and social support services, and to develop students who enjoy studying and learning. The school's ultimate goal is to produce competitive graduates who have an appreciation for scholarship, perform well on meaningful assessments, make meaningful contributions to society, behave with civility and respect, and perform as reasonable leaders.

19th-century curriculum: the five-year course era

The creation of a male high school "in which the higher branches of English and classical literature should be taught exclusively" was authorized unanimously by the Baltimore City Council on March 7, 1839. The school opened its doors October 20, 1839 with 46 students.  Those enrolled were offered two academic tracks, a classical literature track and an English literature track. The sole instructor for both tracks was the educator and poet, Nathan C. Brooks, who also served as principal. To accommodate the two tracks, Brooks split the school day into two sections: one in the morning from 9 am to 12 am, and another in the afternoon from 2 pm to 5 pm. During the morning session, students studied either classics or English; however, the afternoon was devoted to English. In 1849, after a decade of service, Prof. Brooks resigned as principal of the school, which had now grown to include 232 students and 7 teachers, excluding Brooks.

Rev. Dr. Francis G. Waters, who had been the president of the Washington College, succeeded Brooks. The following year the city council renamed the school "The Central High School of Baltimore" and granted the commissioners of the public schools the right to confer certificates to the high school's graduates, a practice still in place today. By 1850, growing enrollment necessitated a reorganization of the school. Under the direction of Waters, the school day was divided into eight periods lasting forty-five minutes: four sessions were held in the morning and four in the afternoon. In addition to reorganizing the schedule, he divided the courses into seven different departments: Belles-letters and history, mathematics, natural sciences, moral, mental, and political science, ancient languages, modern languages and music. Each of the seven instructors was assigned to a distinct department and received the title of "professor".

In 1850, the Baltimore City Council granted the school the authority to present its graduates with certificates of completion. An effort to expand that academic power and allow the then-named "Central High School of Baltimore" to confer Bachelor of Arts degrees began in 1865, and continued the following year with the renaming of the institution as "The Baltimore City College" the retitling of its chief academic officer from "principal" to "president", along with an increase in the number of years of its course of study and the expansion of its courses. However, despite this early elevation effort, it ended unsuccessfully in 1869, although Baltimore City College continued for a number of years as a hybrid public high school and early form of junior college (later known as community college) which did not fully appear in America until the beginning of the 20th century. As the importance of college education increased toward the end of the 19th century, the school's priorities shifted to preparing students for college.

20th-century curriculum: the A/B course era

In 1901, the course of study at Baltimore City College went through a series of further changes. The most significant was the reduction of the five-year course of study to four years; though students who entered prior to 1900 were allowed to complete the five-year course. The new course, like the course it replaced, allowed graduates to be admitted to Johns Hopkins University without examination, and provided students with greater flexibility. Instead of requiring students to complete the same set of courses, it allowed students to choose their courses, as long as they completed 150 credits. From 1927 to the early 1990s, the college preparatory curriculum at Baltimore City College was divided into two tracks: the "A" course and the "B" course. Though both tracks were intended to provide students with the skills necessary for college, the "A" course was intended to be more rigorous, enabling students to complete sufficient college-level courses to enter directly into the second year of college. In the early-1990s, then-Principal Joseph Antenson removed the two-tier system because he believed it to be racially discriminatory.

The 1960s and 1970s
Population decline in the city of Baltimore due to the migration of middle-class white populations to the suburbs during the 1950s and 1960s, coupled with the failure of Baltimore City Public Schools officials to address infrastructure improvements needed in the school's deteriorating, then-thirty-seven-year-old main academic building lead to a gradually declining public perception of the school's academic reputation. In response, school administrators and faculty developed the "City Forever" strategic plan in 1965–66. The performance improvement plan also served as a call to action for the school community, resulting in formal recommendations from the Alumni Association, a series of student-led demonstrations, newspaper articles and television news segments produced by alumni working as media professionals, letters-to-the-editors of local newspapers submitted by parents and teachers, and routine public comments in support of City College at School Board meetings. The public outcry stunned city leadership, which resulted in the district announcing a recommitment to Baltimore City College and its unique role as the selective flagship high school of Baltimore.

Over the next decade, the local school district failed to delivery on its pledge to adequately fund the revitalized Baltimore City College curriculum and enforce higher admissions standards. In 1975, City students, faculty, and influential alumni like then-Mayor of Baltimore William Donald Schaefer '39 and then-City Comptroller Hyman A. Pressman '33 again engaged in a series of coordinated campaigns, urging political leaders and members of the School Board to provide the resources and enforce the high standards the school needs to succeed. As a result, the City of Baltimore announced its plan to advance funds to complete a $9 million renovation of the school's main building and earmarked funding for a comprehensive, two-year study (1977–79). Subject matter experts in education and pedagogy, school faculty, parents, alumni, and other members of the school community formed the "New City College Task Force". The task force, which combed through two decades of previous improvement plans, academic proposals, and experimental curricula, recommended to the School Board a plan that included stricter admissions and retention standards, a revitalized humanities- and liberal arts-based curriculum, and the autonomy to selectively recruit new, highly qualified faculty and administrators.

The Baltimore City Board of School Commissioners ultimately accepted all but one of the task force's recommendations in 1979. The group recommended maintaining the school's then-141-year-old tradition of all-male education. Citing concerns over conflicting federal and district court decisions which had not yet been resolved by the U.S. Supreme Court, the school board voted to make City a coeducational school. The board's action followed trends at the time at all-male colleges and universities like Harvard University, Yale University, and nearby Johns Hopkins University, which admitted women during the 1970s.

The 1990s

By 1990, enrollment was declining and the academic program at Baltimore City College had once again become subpar compared to its historically high standards. The Middle States Association of Colleges and Schools, the organization that had accredited the school for years, began raising questions about the institution's ability to offer students an academically rigorous course of study. During this period of decline, the "A" Course was discontinued by newly appointed Principal Joseph Antenson, who contended that the program was racially discriminatory and opted for a standardized curriculum. Antenson was dismissed in 1992 after two tumultuous years as head of school and for the first time ever a private contractor was hired to operate Baltimore City College.

In 1994, Joseph M. Wilson, a lawyer by trade with degrees from Amherst College (B.A.), the University of Pennsylvania (M.A.), the University of Southern California (J.D.), and Harvard University (M.A.), was appointed principal and with the support of alumni and parents, was able to secure more funding and additional autonomy from the Baltimore City Public Schools. Wilson introduced the IB Diploma Program in 1998. The turnaround Wilson orchestrated led to a quick resurgence and restoration of the school's academic reputation. Enrollment, student performance, and the quality of the colleges and universities to which graduates matriculated improved, which attracted critical acclaim from education professionals and international media attention. In 2000, City College was recognized as a National Blue Ribbon School, the highest academic honor bestowed by the U.S. Department of Education. In 2001, the Toronto National Post reported on its search for the perfect high school in Great Britain, the United States, and Canada. One subject of the prominent feature article was Baltimore City College and its turnaround.

21st-century curriculum
International Baccalaureate (IB) is a rigorous, internationally accepted academic program required of all 21st century Baltimore City College students. The IB Middle Years Program is intended to teach freshman and sophomore students to understand how core subjects are interrelated, how to master critical thinking processes, and to increase intercultural awareness. As juniors and seniors, students engage in the rigorous two-year IB Diploma curriculum that requires a comprehensive study of world topics, literature, languages, science, and math. City College's IB certificate and diploma programs provide upperclassmen access to thirty advanced studies courses, which often translate into credit hours at colleges and universities worldwide.

Despite some concerns of the school's alumni association, school administrators proceeded with plans to expand the City College IB Program by incorporating the IB Middle Years Program into the 9th and 10th grade curricula. In addition to the IB courses, the school's academic program offers a small selection of Advanced Placement courses.

International Baccalaureate course offerings
As of the 2015–2016 school year, the International Baccalaureate courses below are offered at the school. Some courses are offered at the higher level (HL) and standard level (SL).

Graduation requirements
Students who successfully complete the school's required curriculum earn the Baltimore City College diploma upon graduation, which has been granted since 1851. The requirements are more stringent than those designated by the State of Maryland.

Requirements for the Baltimore City College Diploma:
 Successful completion of a minimum of one IB Diploma- or Certificate-level course, or AP course
 Successful completion of the IB Personal Project
 Physics or an advanced-level IB/AP science
 Two Fine Arts courses (requirement waived for IB Diploma candidates)
 Successful completion of the College Writing seminar (requirement waived for IB Diploma candidates and students enrolled in IB English IV)
 Minimum cumulative GPA of 70%
 Submit admission applications to a minimum of four colleges (including FAFSA submission)
 Take the SAT or ACT at least two times
 75 hours of documented Service Learning activity

Admissions
Admission to Baltimore City College is selective but is open to residents of Baltimore City and the surrounding counties in the metropolitan area, though non-Baltimore City residents must pay tuition. Applicants must meet all requirements for promotion to ninth grade, as determined by the Maryland State Department of Education. Additionally, applicants must earn a minimum composite score of 610, calculated by Baltimore City Public Schools. Generally, candidates for admission must have a 3.0 overall numeric grade average (B letter grade; 80 or better percentage grade), have at least a 3.0 average in both Mathematics and English, rank in the 65th percentile or better among all Maryland students in Math and English on the Maryland School Assessment (MSA), and have 90% or better attendance rate. Due to the highly competitive nature of the City College admissions process, successful applicants typically exceed the aforementioned minimums. J.D. Merrill, BCC '09, is the school's current Director of Admissions and Institutional Advancement.

Enrollment 
There were 1,309 students enrolled at Baltimore City College in 2015. Of those students, 43 percent were male and 57 percent were female. 85 percent of the total student body identifies as African-American. 10 percent of students at the school identify as Caucasian. Roughly two percent of City College students identifies as Hispanic. One percent of the total student population identifies as Asian.

Athletics

Interscholastic athletics at Baltimore City College date back over 120 years. Though varsity sports were not formally organized until 1895, interscholastic athletics became a fixture at the school earlier in the 19th century. In the late-1890s, City competed in the Maryland Intercollegiate Football Association (MIFA), a nine-member league consisting of colleges in Washington, D.C. and Maryland. City College was the lone secondary school among MIFA membership. The 1895 football schedule included St. John's College, Swarthmore College, the United States Naval Academy, University of Maryland, and Washington College. Between 1894 and 1920, City College regularly faced off against the Johns Hopkins Blue Jays and the Navy Midshipmen in lacrosse.

Baltimore City College began competing against other secondary schools in 1919 when it was invited to join the Maryland Scholastic Association (MSA) as a founding member. After 75 years of governing Baltimore-metro area boys' high school athletics, the Maryland Scholastic Association dissolved in 1993 when its 15 public school members, including City College, withdrew from the league to join the Maryland Public Secondary Schools Athletic Association (MPSSAA). The Knights currently compete with other public secondary schools in the MPSSAA (Class 3A, North Region, District 9), more commonly referred to as the Baltimore City League (Division 1), but routinely schedule contests against area private schools in various sports.

The current City College varsity athletic program consists of 18 sports: six for boys, seven for girls, and five coeducational teams. The boys' sports includes baseball, basketball, football, lacrosse, soccer, and wrestling. The girls' sports are badminton, basketball, lacrosse, soccer, softball, and volleyball. The five co-ed sports are cross country, indoor track and field, swimming, outdoor track and field, and tennis. Girls' sports were added to City's athletic department in the fall of 1978 when the school became coeducational for the first time in its then-139-year-old history.

Basketball

Basketball has been played at Baltimore City College for more than a century. One of the earliest recorded results in program history is a one-point overtime road loss to the University of Maryland Terrapins (then known as the Maryland Agricultural College Aggies) on January 25, 1913. 
Baltimore City College currently competes in District 9 (Baltimore City League) of the MPSSAA.

Football 

The Baltimore City College football program began in the mid-1870s, and has won more than 20 MSA A-Conference and MPSSAA championships in its history. The Knights primarily competed against are colleges and universities throughout the 1880s and 1890s because few secondary schools existed at the time. The program began competing against other high schools at the beginning of the 20th century, and has held since 1941 the record for the longest streak of games played without a loss in MSA and MPSSAA history. The Knights played 54 consecutive games without a loss between 1934 and 1941. Harry Lawrence, who guided the Knights to a 38-game undefeated streak between 1936 and 1940 (including 35 wins, three ties, and four MSA championships), remains City College's most successful head football coach.

City–Poly rivalry (1889–present) 

The City-Poly football rivalry is the oldest American football rivalry in Maryland, and one of the oldest public school football rivalries in the United States. The rivalry began in 1889, when City College met the Baltimore Polytechnic Institute (Poly) at Clifton Park for a football scrimmage in which City's freshman team beat Poly. City remained undefeated in the series until 1908.

With City's 32–14 win in 2018, the series is tied at 62-62-6.

Swimming
On February 22, 2020, at the Maryland Public Secondary Schools Athletic Association 3A, 2A, 1A swimming and diving championships held in College Park, City's swim team finished in 14th place. City sophomore Taj Benton led the Knights, finishing 1st in the 100 yard butterfly and 4th in the 200 yard individual medley. Benton is the first student from a Baltimore City public school to win a state championship in any statewide swimming event.

Extracurricular activities 
Baltimore City College offers more than 20 student clubs and organizations. These include chapters of national organizations such as the National Honor Society (established at the school in 1927) and Quill and Scroll. Service clubs include the Red Cross Club and Campus Improvement Association. Other activities include the Drama Club, which produces an annual play, the Art Club, Model UN, Band, Dance, and One City One Book, an organization that invites the entire school community to read one book selected by faculty and invites the author of the book for a reading, discussion, and question and answer period. In 2007, Pulitzer Prize winner, MacArthur Fellow, and novelist Edward P. Jones discussed his book Lost in the City. The school store is operated by students and managed by the Student Government Association. One of City College's most notable academic teams is the It's Academic team which participates on It's Academic, a local television show.

Speech and debate/literary and debating societies 

The Baltimore City College debate team has a long and storied tradition that dates back over 150 years. The speech and debate teams are formally referred to as the Bancroft and Carrollton-Wight Literary Societies. The school's first formal debate team within a literary society was established in 1876 as the Bancroft Literary Association. In 1878, a second competing society, the Carrollton Literary Society, was formed, named for Maryland's famous longest-living signer of the Declaration of Independence, the only Roman Catholic member, Charles Carroll of Carrollton (1737–1832). That society was later renamed the "Carrollton-Wight Literary Society", in honor of the program's first advisor, Charles Wight, a celebrated faculty member during the 1870s.

Today, the speech and debate team competes in various speech events, Student Congress, Mock Trial, Lincoln-Douglas debate, and Policy Debate against teams throughout Maryland and routinely travels around the United States to compete on the national circuit. The team currently participates in four competitive debate leagues: the Baltimore Catholic Forensic League, the Baltimore Urban Debate League, the Chesapeake region of the National Catholic Forensic League, and the National Forensic League. Several community partners, including the Abell Foundation and the Baltimore Community Foundation, which endowed the Gilbert Sandler Fund for Speech and Debate  in 2008, help provide financial support to the program.

Bands and orchestra 

The marching band at Baltimore City College was created in the late 1940s. At the time, the instrumental music program consisted of the orchestra, concert band and marching band. The director who brought the band to prominence was Dr. Donald Norton. In 1954, while on sabbatical, he was replaced by Professor Charles M. Stengstacke. The 65 member concert band doubled as a marching band in the fall. During halftime performances at home the band would form the shape of a heart or a car, but always ending the performance by forming the letters C-I-T-Y.

In the 1980s, under James Russell Perkins, these groups grew in size and changed styles, adding "soulful" dance steps. Perkins's groups toured and traveled the east coast. They received superior ratings at district and state festivals. Perkins is responsible for the creation of the City College Jazz Band, the "Knights of Jazz". In 1994, Alvin T. Wallace became Band Director. During his tenure, a wind ensemble was added and the marching band grew to include over 150 members. In 1999, the band swept the top categories in the Disney World high school band competition. In 2006, the wind ensemble received a grade of superior at the district adjudication festival and marched in the Baltimore Mayor's Christmas Day Parade.

Choirs 

The Baltimore City College choir was founded in 1950 by Professor Donald Regier. Originally a co-curricular subject with only 18 members, by 1954 it had developed into a major subject of study with 74 students enrolled.
Under the direction of Linda Hall, today's choir consists of four groups: the Mixed Chorus, the Concert Choir, the Singin'/Swingin' Knights, and the Knights and Daze Show Choir.

The Mixed Choir is opened to all students at City College and currently has a membership of approximately 135 students. The Concert Choir is a more selective group consisting of about 50 students, who must audition for their places in the choir. The Singin'/Swingin' Knights is an even more selective group composed of 25 students. The Knights and Daze Show Choir is a group of students, who perform a choreographed dance routine while they sing. With the exception of the Knights and Daze Show Choir, which performs jazz and pop music, the choir's repertoire consists of gospel music, spirituals, and Classical works by composers such as Handel and Michael Praetorius.

The choir has traveled to Europe on several occasions. Its first trip was in 1999, after receiving an invitation to perform at the Choralfest in Arezzo, Italy. In 2003, the choir returned to Italy to perform at the annual Conference of the Parties of the United Nations Framework Convention on Climate Change. The choir has also performed in France and Spain. On October 2, 2007, the Weill Institute of Music at Carnegie Hall announced that the City College choir was one of four high school choirs selected to participate in the National High School Choral Festival on March 10, 2008. The four choirs performed Johannes Brahms' A German Requiem under the direction of Craig Jessop, Mormon Tabernacle Choir Director. The choirs were led by their own directors in performing choral selections of their choosing.

Student publications

The Green Bag 
The Green Bag is the senior class annual at the Baltimore City College. Published continuously since 1896, it is the oldest publication still in existence at the school and is one of the oldest high school or college yearbooks in America. G. Warfield Hobbs Jr. (later an Episcopal priest), president of the 1896 senior class and first editor-in-chief of The Green Bag, gave the publication its name in recognition of the role of City College graduates in political leadership. Historically, the famous green "carpet bag" in the 19th century containing the lists of political appointees (also known as "patronage") of the Governor of Maryland to be approved by the General Assembly of Maryland has long been known as the "green bag", though the derivation of the term is unknown. The term became synonymous with "good news" and "glad tidings", such as could be applied to the feelings that recent graduates felt when seeing and reading their new yearbooks published soon after their graduations.

The first yearbooks contained sketches of faculty and seniors, and included recollections, anecdotes, stories, and quotes significant to the student body. Underclassmen were included for the first time with individual portraits in the growing student body in 1948. In 2007, The Green Bag released its first full-color edition, one of the most colorful since color printing of photographs was first introduced in The Bag in 1963 and again in 1967. For many years the annual was printed by the local well-known printer/publisher of H.G. Roebuck and Son, owned by a City alumnus up to 1970 The most controversial issue of The Green Bag was published in 1900 when members of the senior class used the annual to make fun of their professors. The Baltimore City Board of School Commissioners attempted to censor the edition by requiring The Green Bag to be reviewed by Principal Francis A. Soper. The yearbook had already been printed, and in defiance of the school board, the editors refused to have the edition censored and reprinted. The School Board responded by withholding the diplomas of six of the editors and the business manager and by preventing the school from holding a public commencement ceremony. One of the boys expelled, Clarence Keating Bowie, became a member of the School Board himself in 1926. The infamous cartoon was later printed for the first time in a "Bag" in an opening segment on school history in 1972.

The Collegian 
The Collegian has been the school student newspaper of record at Baltimore City College since it was first published as a bi-weekly newspaper in 1929. There have been other similar publications, such as The Oriole, the student magazine which started printing in 1912, however The Collegian is oldest, continuous student-run publication. Originally, the newspaper was both managed and printed by students. During the 1930s, The Collegian won numerous awards including second place in the Columbia Scholastic Press Association's annual contest for five years in a row. Since 2000, printing of the publication has been scaled back. The Collegian is now published quarterly, often with a bonus issue around the time of the annual City-Poly football game. Since 2014, The Collegian also actively engages students and alumni through various social media platforms.

Alumni Association 

The Baltimore City College Alumni Association Inc. (BCCAA) was established in 1866 as a support network for City College. The BCCAA holds an annual meeting at the school every November and its Board of Governors meets the first Monday of each month at the school.

The BCCAA publishes the class reunion guide, established and maintains a life membership endowment fund, presents Golden Apple Awards annually to faculty members, sponsors the Hall of Fame selection and induction, publishes a semi-annual newsletter, maintains an alumni database, and assists with projects designed to enrich student life and improve the school's facilities.

Trustees of the Baltimore City College Scholarship Funds 
The Trustees of the Baltimore City College Scholarship Funds, Inc., was established and incorporated in 1983, and replaced a similar entity that was established in 1924. The Trustees manage endowments, most of which provide annual scholarships to graduating seniors based on criteria stipulated by the donors. Combined endowment assets are currently valued at or around $1.68 million (adjusted for inflation) covering thirty-four annual scholarships. To recognize the custodianship provided by the Trustees, the BCCAA has placed a bronze plaque in the main hall of the school which carries an individually cast nameplate for each of the thirty-four permanent endowments held by the Trustees.

Baltimore City College Hall of Fame 
The Baltimore City College Hall of Fame induction ceremony is held annually in October. Alumni who have demonstrated extraordinary service to the school, city, state, country, or world are elected to the Hall of Fame, with former inductees, alumni, and students attending the two-hour ceremony. Inductees have included Vice-President at Goldman Sachs Robert Hormats in 2007, and Maryland State delegate Curt Anderson in 2013.

Notable alumni 

Many City College alumni have become civil servants, including two of the 10 individuals currently representing the state of Maryland in the U.S. Congress, Congressman Dutch Ruppersberger and Senator Ben Cardin. Among graduates with significant military service are two Commandants of the U.S. Coast Guard –  Rear Admiral Frederick C. Billard and Admiral J. William Kime, as well as 2nd Lieutenant Jacob Beser of the U.S. Army Air Corps the only individual to serve on both atomic bomb missions over Japan in 1945.  In addition, three City College alumni are also recipients of the congressional  Medal of Honor, the nation's highest military award.

The list of BCC alumni also includes prominent scientists, notable writers and successful businessmen.

Notable faculty members 

 Ed Burns, Edgar Award-winning writer for The Corner and The Wire
 McFadden Newell, first principal of Towson University
 ZZ Packer, author, Guggenheim Fellow
 George L. P. Radcliffe, U.S. Senator
 Joel I. Seidman (1906-1977), professor and author of The Yellow Dog Contract
 Robert Herring Wright, first president, East Carolina University
 George Young, NFL executive, General Manager New York Giants

Principals 

 Nathan C. Brooks (1839–1849), first principal of "The High School". 
 Rev. Francis G. Waters (1849–1853),  second principal of the then renamed "Central High School of Baltimore".
 George Morrison
 Dr. Thomas D. Baird
 Joseph Elliott
 Francis A. Soper (1890–1911), longest serving tenured principal of 21 years
 Wilbur F. Smith (1911–1926)
 Dr. Frank R. Blake (1926-1932)
 Dr. Phillip H. Edwards (1932-1948)
 Chester H. Katzenkamp (1948-1956)
 Henry T. Yost (1956-1963)
 Dr. Julius G. Hlubb (1963-1967)
 Dr. Jerome G. Denaburg (1967-1970)
 Pierre H. Davis,  (1970–1974), first Black principal 
 Dr. Solomon Lausch (1979- x)
 Dr. Joseph Antenson
 Ms. Doris Johnson (acting)
 Dr. Joseph Wilson
 Cynthia (Cindy) Harcum (2010–present), one of the first female graduates of the City College, later became its female principal.

References

External links

External links 

 
 Baltimore City College at Baltimore City Schools
 Baltimore City College Alumni Association Inc. (BCCAA)

 
Educational institutions established in 1839
Public high schools in Maryland
International Baccalaureate schools in Maryland
Magnet schools in Maryland
Middle States Commission on Secondary Schools
Public schools in Baltimore
1839 establishments in Maryland
Baltimore City Landmarks